Associazione Sportiva Dilettantistica Trezzano Calcio or simply Trezzano is an Italian association football club located in Trezzano sul Naviglio, Lombardy. It currently plays in Eccellenza.

History

A.C. Naviglio Trezzano 

A.C. Naviglio Trezzano was founded in 2003 after the merger of A.C. Naviglio 95 and A.C. Trezzano Vigor. At the end of the 2010-11 Eccellenza season, the side was promoted from Eccellenza Lombardy to Serie D for the first time.

A.S.D. Trezzano Calcio 
In the summer 2012 the club was renamed A.S.D. Trezzano Calcio. At the end of the 2012–13 season it was relegated to Eccellenza.

Colors and badge 
Its colors are violet, yellow and blue.

References

External links 
 Official homepage

 
Association football clubs established in 2003
Football clubs in Lombardy
2003 establishments in Italy